Coreoperca kawamebari, commonly known as the Japanese perch,  redfin perch, Japanese river perch, Eye-spot perch or in Anglophone parts of Japan, simply the perch, is a predatory species of the freshwater perch native to Japan and southern Korea.
They are sometimes kept as pets. 
The Japanese perch (Coreoperca kawamebari) are a member of the perch family but with the predatory feeding behaviour of the black bass (Micropterus) and bluegill (Lepomis macrochirus).

Description 
Japanese perch are greenish with red pelvic, anal and caudal fins. They have  five to eight dark vertical bars on their sides. They can live for up to 7 years.

Diet
The Japanese perch is a predatory species. Juveniles feed on zooplankton, bottom invertebrate fauna, other fish fry, scuds, small shrimp and insects, while adults feed on both invertebrates and smaller fish, mainly Japanese rice fish, Japanese minnows (Nipponocypris temminckii, Rhynchocypris, Gnathopogon elongatus), Japanese smelt (Hypomesus nipponensis) fry, small crayfish and tadpole.

Reproduction
A Japanese perch usually matures in two to three years, but a Japanese perch that lives in warmer waters has the ability to reproduce in the first year of life. A single female has the potential to lay from 250 to 1,000 eggs annually. Japanese perch will journey to warmer shallow water for spawning. The primary spawning season for the Japanese perch occurs from the middle of April through approximately June, depositing their eggs on water plants or the branches of trees or shrubs immersed in the water.

Predators 
The Japanese perch is a frequent prey of many fish-eating predators, such as the great cormorant and common kingfisher.

See also
Vallisneria

References

External links

Fish of Japan
Freshwater fish of Japan
Japanese perch
Sinipercidae